A protomartyr (Koine Greek, πρότος prótos "first" + μάρτυρας mártyras "martyr") is the first Christian martyr in a country or among a particular group, such as a religious order.  Similarly, the phrase the Protomartyr (with no other qualification of country or region) can mean Saint Stephen, the first martyr of the Christian church.
Saint Thecla the Protomartyr, the first female martyr of the Christian church, is known as "apostle and protomartyr among women".

References

Protomartyrs